The 1901 Louisiana Industrial football team was an American football team that represented the Louisiana Industrial Institute (now known as Louisiana Tech University) as an independent during the 1901 college football season. In their first and only year under head coach Edwin Barber, the team compiled a 0–2 record. This was the first season of what is now known as the Louisiana Tech Bulldogs football program.

Schedule

References

Louisiana Industrial
Louisiana Tech Bulldogs football seasons
Louisiana Industrial football